Ruffey Lake Park (locally Ruffeys) is a park in the City of Manningham, Melbourne, Victoria, Australia. It is situated around Ruffey Lake in a portion of a valley through which the Ruffey Creek runs, forming the border between Doncaster and Templestowe. It has three main entrances, Victoria St, The Boulevard and King St. Despite being the second largest park in Manningham, second to Westerfolds Park, it is the biggest urban park managed by the City of Manningham. It is approximately 68 hectares (168 acres) in size. Formerly orchards, the park has a diverse ecology; this includes a riparian strip of native bushland around the creek, areas of pine trees planted by early settlers and pockets of fruit trees remaining from past orchards.

The park is named after Ruffey Creek, a watercourse that runs through the park which was dammed to irrigate the surrounding orchards, forming Ruffey Lake. During the summer, the park hosts the annual Manningham Carols by Candlelight.

History

After European settlement, the native bushland was cleared for orchards and in 1966 the then City of Doncaster and Templestowe Council purchased land for open space use. Ruffey Creek was dammed in the mid 1990s creating Ruffey Lake. Today, the creek and lake serve as storm water drainage basins, rubbish dropped on the streets regularly flows down the creek and there are waste catchers deployed in the lake itself to catch some of this pollution.

The Wurundjeri descendants in the area still have a strong association with Westerfolds Park at Templestowe.

Facilities
The park has three toilet blocks and electric barbecues are distributed throughout. There are three playgrounds in Ruffey Lake Park; near the Boulevard and Victoria St entrances. In the last 10 years facilities have been upgraded, predominantly the playgrounds, especially the Victoria Street adventure playground. There are sealed pathways giving access to almost every area of the park. These are of standard width and in relatively good condition but do not host dividing lines. The north-west area of the park has fewer facilities.

Victoria St Entrance

The Victoria St entrance is the unofficial main entrance to the park. It hosts a 3-storey adventure playground with swings, slides, ladders, a sandpit, a flying fox, a 4-storey dome with stairs and ladders and more. There are also barbecues, Upgraded (Winter 2011) new Unisex toilets, drinking fountains, maps of the park and an shelters with seating. Concrete tiles on pathways details sponsors and donators to the facilities.

The Boulevard Entrance
The Boulevard entrance is mainly used by local residents. The playground is surrounded by a hilly area and is smaller than Victoria St but is still in good condition. It contains slides, swings, ladders, monkey bars, a flat area to play footy or soccer and more. It has resources such as barbecues, toilets, a map of the park, drinking fountains and an undercover seating area. The playground is sometimes visited by an ice-cream truck. In the summer, the area around this entrance hosts Manningham Carols by Candlelight in December and The Iranian Fire Festival in March.

Other features
Just to the south of the lake is a hill used by BMX enthusiasts with many small tracks and a range of jumps.

Gallery

See also

 Melbourne parks and gardens
 City of Manningham
 Ruffey Creek Trail

References

External links
Profile at Manningham Website
Photos at Worldisround.com

Lakes of Melbourne
Melbourne Water catchment
Rivers of Greater Melbourne (region)
Parks in Melbourne
Urban public parks
City of Manningham